Pontgibaud is a commune in the Puy-de-Dôme départment in Auvergne in central France.

It is located in the Massif Central region of France on the banks of the river Sioule.  The area around the town was historically known for silver and lead mining.
The Société des mines et fonderies de Pontgibaud exploited the lead-silver mines between 1852 and 1897.

The remnants of Château-Dauphin, a 12th-century castle, are located in Pontgibaud.

John Ruskin spent October 7, 1840 exploring Pontgibaud. He reckoned it "Altogether the happiest day, as far as employment or scenery can go, I have had for these long five years".

Notable people 

 Anna Garcin-Mayade, painter and member of the French Resistance

See also
Communes of the Puy-de-Dôme department

References

Communes of Puy-de-Dôme